My Uncle Benjamin (French: Mon oncle Benjamin) is a 1924 French silent comedy film directed by René Leprince and starring Léon Mathot, Madeleine Erickson and Charles Lamy.

Cast
 Léon Mathot as Benjamin Rathery 
 Madeleine Erickson as Manette 
 Charles Lamy as Machecourt 
 Betty Carter as Madame Machecourt 
 Émile Garandet as Le docteur Minxit 
 André Clairius as Pont-Cassé 
 Madame De Houx as Arabella

References

Bibliography
 Dayna Oscherwitz & MaryEllen Higgins. The A to Z of French Cinema. Scarecrow Press, 2009.

External links 
 

1924 films
French comedy films
French silent feature films
1924 comedy films
1920s French-language films
Films directed by René Leprince
French black-and-white films
Films based on French novels
Pathé films
Silent comedy films
1920s French films